Natrona County is a county in the U.S. state of Wyoming. As of the 2020 United States Census, the population was 79,955, making it the second-most populous county in Wyoming. Its county seat is Casper.

Natrona County comprises the Casper, WY Metropolitan Statistical Area.

In 2010, the center of population of Wyoming was in Natrona County, near Alcova.

History
Prior to Wyoming's settlement by European-based populations, the area's stretches played host to nomadic tribes such as Cheyenne, Arapaho, Shoshone, and Sioux.

New York investor John Jacob Astor established the settlement of Astoria on the Columbia River, and sent Robert Stuart eastward to blaze a trail and lay the foundation of a string of trading posts. Stuart documented the South Pass Route through the Continental Divide, near the SW corner of present-day Natrona County. Stuart's company erected the first hut in the area in 1812, near present-day Bessemer Bend.

In 1840, Father Pierre-Jean De Smet began preaching the Christian teaching to this area's indigenous peoples. He carved his name on Independence Rock and called it The Register of the Desert. Later explorers who inscribed the rock include John C. Frémont (1843), who explored the country along the Platte and Sweetwater Rivers.

The first Euro-American settlement occurred in the Casper area in the late 19th century. Natrona County was created by the legislature of the Wyoming Territory on March 9, 1888, and it was organized in 1890. The land for Natrona County was annexed from Carbon County.

Natrona County was named for the deposits of natron found in the area. According to George Mitchell, first mayor of Casper and member of the organization commission for Natrona County, the name was first suggested "by my old friend the late Cy Iba, who at one time owned the soda lakes."  In 1909, Natrona County gained land from Fremont County. The boundaries were adjusted slightly in 1911 and 1931, and at that point the county gained its present outline.

Geography

Geographic features

 Casper Mountain
 Devil's Gate
 Hell's Half Acre
 Independence Rock
 Martin's Cove
 Teapot Rock

Adjacent counties

 Johnson County – north
 Converse County – east
 Albany County – southeast
 Carbon County – south
 Fremont County – west
 Washakie County – northwest

Major Highways
  Interstate 25

  U.S. Highway 20
  U.S. Highway 26
  U.S. Highway 87
  U.S. Highway 287
  Wyoming Highway 220
  Wyoming Highway 251
  Wyoming Highway 252
  Wyoming Highway 253
  Wyoming Highway 256
  Wyoming Highway 257
  Wyoming Highway 258
  Wyoming Highway 259
  Wyoming Highway 387
  Wyoming Highway 487

Geology
Natrona County derives its name from the vast deposits of the mineral Natron found within the county. Of the 18 million tons of Natron consumed by American industry annually 17 Million tons is mined in Wyoming due to it purity.

National protected areas
Medicine Bow National Forest (part)
Pathfinder National Wildlife Refuge (part)

Demographics

2000 census
As of the 2000 United States Census, of 2000, there were 66,533 persons, 26,819 households, and 17,754 families in the county. The population density was 12 people per square mile (5/km2). There were 29,882 housing units at an average density of 6 per square mile (2/km2). The racial makeup of the county was 94.15% White, 0.76% Black or African American, 1.03% Native American, 0.42% Asian, 0.04% Pacific Islander, 1.92% from other races, and 1.68% from two or more races. 4.90% of the population were Hispanic or Latino of any race. 24.6% were of German, 11.6% English, 11.3% American and 11.2% Irish ancestry.

There were 26,819 households, out of which 32.20% had children under the age of 18 living with them, 51.40% were married couples living together, 10.60% had a female householder with no husband present, and 33.80% were non-families. 27.50% of all households were made up of individuals, and 9.40% had someone living alone who was 65 years of age or older. The average household size was 2.42 and the average family size was 2.95.

The county population contained 26.00% under the age of 18, 10.10% from 18 to 24, 27.90% from 25 to 44, 23.30% from 45 to 64, and 12.70% who were 65 years of age or older. The median age was 36 years. For every 100 females there were 97.70 males. For every 100 females age 18 and over, there were 95.00 males.

The median income for a household in the county was $36,619, and the median income for a family was $45,575. Males had a median income of $33,524 versus $21,374 for females. The per capita income for the county was $18,913. About 8.70% of families and 11.80% of the population were below the poverty line, including 16.20% of those under age 18 and 7.20% of those age 65 or over.

2010 census
As of the 2010 United States Census, there were 75,450 people, 30,616 households, and 19,714 families in the county. The racial makeup of the county was 92.8% white, 1.0% American Indian, 0.9% black or African American, 0.7% Asian, 0.1% Pacific islander, 2.2% from other races, and 2.4% from two or more races. Those of Hispanic or Latino origin made up 6.9% of the population. In terms of ancestry, 27.2% were German, 15.2% were Irish, 13.2% were English, and 10.7% were American.

Of the 30,616 households, 31.9% had children under the age of 18 living with them, 48.1% were married couples living together, 10.9% had a female householder with no husband present, 35.6% were non-families, and 28.5% of all households were made up of individuals. The average household size was 2.41 and the average family size was 2.94. The median age was 36.8 years.

The median income for a household in the county was $50,936 and the median income for a family was $62,859. Males had a median income of $47,610 versus $30,664 for females. The per capita income for the county was $28,235. About 5.4% of families and 8.4% of the population were below the poverty line, including 9.9% of those under age 18 and 8.8% of those age 65 or over.

Communities

Cities
 Casper (county seat)

Towns

 Bar Nunn
 Edgerton
 Evansville
 Midwest
 Mills

Census-designated places

 Alcova
 Antelope Hills
 Bessemer Bend
 Brookhurst
 Casper Mountain
 Hartrandt
 Homa Hills
 Meadow Acres
 Mountain View
 Powder River
 Red Butte
 Vista West

Unincorporated communities

 Arminto
 Bucknum
 Crimson Dawn
 Goose Egg
 Hells Half Acre
 Hiland
 Natrona
 Strouds

Government
Like almost all of Wyoming, Natrona is a heavily Republican county. It is rather conservative for an urban county, having gone Republican in all but three elections since 1944. No Democratic presidential candidate has won forty percent of the county's vote since Lyndon Johnson garnered 52 percent in his 1964 landslide against Barry Goldwater. Bill Clinton did win a 100-vote plurality in the 1992 election due to a significant third-party vote. In 2020, Donald Trump received 71.8% of the vote, the county's highest vote percentage for any presidential candidate since Wyoming statehood in 1890.

Natrona County is governed by a commission, based in the county seat of Casper. The five-member board consists of commissioners, elected to staggered four-year terms.
Current commissioners are:
 Forrest Chadwick (Chairman) – Republican
 John Lawson (Vice-Chairman) – Republican
 Matt Keating – Republican
 Rob Hendry – Republican
 Steve Schlager – Republican

See also
National Register of Historic Places listings in Natrona County, Wyoming
Wyoming
List of cities and towns in Wyoming
List of counties in Wyoming
Wyoming statistical areas
World War II Heritage Cities

References

 
1890 establishments in Wyoming
Populated places established in 1890